Casper Ruud defeated Hugo Gaston in the final, 6–3, 6–2, to win the men's singles tennis title at the 2021 Swiss Open.

Albert Ramos Viñolas was the reigning champion from when the tournament was last held in 2019, but chose to compete in Umag instead.

Seeds
The top four seeds receive a bye into the second round.

Draw

Finals

Top half

Bottom half

Qualifying

Seeds

Qualifiers

Lucky losers

Qualifying draw

First qualifier

Second qualifier

Third qualifier

Fourth qualifier

References

External links
 Main draw
 Qualifying draw

2021 ATP Tour
2021 Singles